Muntinlupa Science High School, known as Muntinlupa Science or MunSci, is a special science public high school in the City of Muntinlupa, Philippines that provides a technical and science curriculum that aims to prepare students for careers in science and technology, math, and communication arts.

The school admits about 200 freshmen out of 600 applicants a year, but in the school year 2008-2009 they added 40 students to be admitted, making it 240.

History
The Division of City Schools of Muntinlupa, with local government officials, residents and students jointly initiated a request to the DECS for the establishment of a school. After the DECS approved the request on April 15, 1999, a Selection Admission Test was administered to 126 student applicants on April 26. The top 72 students composed the batch who were the first to graduate from what would eventually be known as Muntinlupa Science High School.

On June 1, 1998, the school was inaugurated in the presence of local government and division school officials, 72 students, their parents, and six teachers.

After a year at Itaas Elementary School, a three-storey building at 999 Buendia St., Tunasan was inaugurated on June 4, 1999 by city officials headed by former Mayor Jaime R. Fresnedi and DSS Dr. Alma Bella O. Bautista; the DECS office was represented by Dr. Fe Hidalgo. A three-storey building housing the administration office, clinic, guidance counselor|guidance services, library, computer room and two first year classes stands with its back against Laguna de Bay.

On April 1, 2002, the school graduated its first batch of seniors who hold the distinction of having generated the high percentage of UPCAT passers at 64%. During this year under the efforts of Carmen Rodriguez, principal, the first batch of permanent teachers of Muntinlupa Science High School was approved by the Department Of Education. They were Paolo Bundoc (Math), Melody Gonzaga (PE), Cecilia Guevara (Filipino), Arlene Marcos (TLE), Enrico "Bobby" Obsequio (Math), Dory Tamayo (Math) and Edsel Umali (Araling Panlipunan).

Sections
There are 42 sections overall from Grade 7 to Grade 12 in MSHS for the School Year 2019 - 2020.

Grade 7
Ampere, Aristotle, Archimedes, Arrhenius, Armstrong, Avogadro, Avery

Grade 8
Euler, Eigen, Eddington, Edison, Einstein, Euclid, Evans

Grade 9
Feynman, Fleming, Fermi, Faraday, Fahrenheit, Franklin, Fresnel

Grade 10
Priestley, Pasteur, Pauli, Pascal, Pythagoras, Ptolemy, Peano

Grade 11
STEM Strand :
Babbage, Bernoulli, Bohr, Boyle, Burbank, Brouwer, Bacon, Bell, Brown

Grade 12
ABM Strand :
Maxwell, McGregor
STEM Strand :
Napier, Nash, Neumann, Newton, Nobel, Nicomedes

Academics

Science and Technology
Being a science high school, MunSci gives special attention in teaching excellent science courses to its students. Every year level is given two science subjects: one regular and one elective (mandatory). For the regular science, Grade 7 takes integrated science, which is an overview of the basic topics covered in physics, chemistry, biology, geology, and astronomy; Grade 8 takes biology; Grade 9 takes chemistry; and seniors take physics. Students also take elective sciences: biotechnology for 8th graders, consumer chemistry for 9th graders, and physical science for seniors. The MSHS subject coordinator for Science is Ms. Webena Gerona.

Mathematics
The school departs from the basic curriculum followed by most schools and adheres to a more advanced curriculum in mathematics. As with science, students take one regular and one elective (mandatory) for mathematics. Grade 7 take linear algebra and arithmetic for regular and elementary algebra for elective. Grade 8 cover geometry for regular and intermediate algebra for elective. Grade 9 tackle advanced algebra for regular and trigonometry for elective. Seniors study advanced algebra, analytic geometry, and number theory for regular and calculus for elective. The MSHS subject coordinator for Mathematics is Ms. Girley Diquit.

English
The 7th graders English course focuses more on grammar, composition writing and Philippine literature. Works of Filipino writers in English, as well as indigenous myths are discussed, with Amador Daguio’s Wedding Dance being the level’s main literary piece. The 8th graders study the literature of Asia and Africa, as well as advance topics in communication arts and grammar Ramayana of Valmiki is the piece for the grade 8 level. 8th graders are taught to be more analytic by studying pieces for criticism. 9th graders focus more on reading and comprehension using literary pieces from American and English literature, paying special attention to Thomas Malory’s Le Morte d’Arthur and William Shakespeare’s Macbeth, Hamlet, and Romeo and Juliet. Seniors are taught English in real world applications, such as job interviews, plays, and literary criticisms. Victor Hugo’s Les Misérables and Edith Hamilton’s Mythology are the main pieces for literature. The subject coordinator for English is Ms. Reina Aladeza.

Filipino
The Filipino program for the seventh grade students discuss the characteristics of the Filipino language, which includes orthography, phonemic and morphemic changes, and grammar lessons. Ang Ibong Adarna is the piece for literature for the freshmen. The eight grade students study different forms of text and focus more on composition writing with Ms. Arlene Teofisto. They take up Francisco Balagtas’ Florante at Laura. The ninth grade students study literary criticism with literary pieces taken from regions of the Philippines and a special topic for José Rizal’s Noli Me Tangere. Fourth year students step on advanced literary criticism of pieces in world literature translated in Filipino. They study Rizal’s El Filibusterismo. The subject coordinator for Filipino is Mr. Alex Marcellano.

Social Studies
Grade 7 begins their social studies course with geography and Asian studies and what is happening on earth. Grade 8 study anthropology and Asian history and culture. Grade 9 take elementary economics in relation to Philippines’ economic status and the world market. Seniors tackle sociology and contemporary issues. The subject coordinator in social studies is Ms. Celine Calado.

Research
Subject courses in research are now offered in all grades. 9th graders are offered basic theoretic principles in research and statistics. Students may specialize either in biotechnology or microbiology. Seniors are given advanced applied principles in research and thesis writing. Students are required to conduct their own research study and a defense is required at the end of their course.

Information and Communication Technology
All ICT classes are held in the school’s three ICT laboratories: the computer laboratory which is for basic computer processes and applications, the internet laboratory for web and engineering applications, and the electronics laboratory for the electronics and communications students. 7th graders study the history of computers, with specialization in basic Windows programs. Lessons in operating Microsoft Office programs are also offered. 8th graders study internet and related topics, such as HTML encoding and web page making. Java and Pascal programs are also studied along with Logic operations using different number bases. Seniors may either take Computer Engineering, where they are taught hardware maintenance and repair; Logic, for students interested in integrated and digital circuits which operate in the binary system; or Basic Electronics. Seniors take Electronics, where they learn the components and processes of an electronic circuit. They are required to build an electronic device and a defense follows at the end of their course. Led by sir Albert A. Manalo Nambawan, the ICT teacher.

Journalism
This is only offered to 9th grade, and 10th grade students as an elective. Journalism is offered to 9th graders and seniors, for the basic principles, and for the field work and applications, respectively. Students produce the school’s official publication in Filipino, Ang Matyag. The same goes for the English journalism, with its official publication, The Monitor. English Journalism was handled by Roderick de Leon until 2014 and Filipino Journalism was handled by Cecilia Guevarra until 2015. The Filipino Journalism is now handled by Mr. Alex C. Marcellano while English Journalism is now spearheaded by Ms. Gemma Jereza.

Foreign Languages
The school offers classes in foreign languages to grade 9 and 10 levels as an elective. Students are offered classes in language in culture of Nihongo and French.

Grade 9 students who choose the elective Nihongo, will tackle the 3 Japanese alphabets, hiragana, katakana, and kanji, as well as basic Japanese expressions.

Grade 9 students who choose the elective French, will study basic and a little of advanced French and learn to communicate fluently in the language when the course is finished.

Technology and Livelihood Education
Basic TLE education, which covers all areas of home economics and entrepreneurship, is offered to 7th and 8th grade students. The MSHS subject coordinator for TLE is Mr. Albert Manalo.

Values Education
All year levels are taught lessons pertaining to values enrichment, without adhering to any particular Christian sect. Predominantly, all lessons are based on a Philosophical and Psychological standpoint.

Music and Arts
7th grade music cover the Philippine music. 8th grade specialize in Asian music. while the 9th graders study history of world music, with special attention given to the history of western music. Seniors study modern music. Students may take elective classes in music such as chorale or choir and rondalla ensemble. The same coverage is followed for Arts.

Physical Education and Health
Students may enter physical education classes which specialize in a sport: basketball (men and women), volleyball (men and women), badminton, football (men and women), table tennis, and chess. Students may opt to enter an elective class for dance troupe. Health topics cover human health, population and drug education for all year levels.

Technical Writing
This course is offered to Grade 7 students. This subject focuses more in complex foundations of English. It focuses on parts of speech, references, and other parts of the English language.

Student activities

The Muntinlupa Science High School Chorale
The school's choir is Muntinlupa Science High School (MSHS) chorale. The chorale joined choir competitions like the Voices in Harmony (2006) and Ang Aming Munting Handog chorale festival where they achieved the Grand Champion spot on December 6, 2008. They took the first runner up spot in 2006 and 2007. They also joined MUSIKAPELLA where they won second runner up (2007 and 2008) and Best in Choice Piece (2008), Rotary Club Manila (2007) where they won first runner up, and SM malls singing makabayan choir competition where they were hailed Grand Champions.

The MSHS chorale took third place in the NAMCYA 2008 choir category making them one of the best youth choirs in the National Capital Region. In 2010 they become the champion in MCL show choir competition, Hallmark Music and Memories Chorale Competition and Voices In Harmony 2010. In 2012, they were hailed Grand Champion in the 1st Xinghai Prize International Choir Championships held in Guangzhou, China. Subsequently, they took the first place in Voices in Harmony 2012.

MSHS Rondalla
In 2005, with the guidance of Ivy Rose B. Casiguran, the Rondalla Group was formed. Shierly Protacio of II - Evans was the first president.

In 2007, with the guidance of music teacher Shellah Y. Doniza, the MSHS Rondalla was established. Catherine de Guzman of III - Fahrenheit (2007–08) was the first to be elected as the president and helds the presidency for two consecutive years followed by Sarah Jane dela Cruz of IV - Priestley (2009–10), Kathleen Lopena of IV - Pascal (2010–11), Elsbeth Nacino of IV - Pasteur (2011–12), Angela Borlongan of IV - Pasteur (2012–13), and Ferdinand Bundoc of IV - Pythagoras (2013–14).

They participated in the 2007 NAMCYA Rondalla High School category and reached the regional level with the pieces Maynila (Obertura) and Bakas ng Kahapon held at the University of the Philippines - Diliman, competing with seven other rondalla groups in the National Capital Region. In December 2011, the group represented the Philippines in the International Children's Arts and Culture Festival held in Kuala Lumpur, Malaysia. Local and school occasions were attended by the group since its establishment. Despite of the young age of the group, they brought excellence and dignity in the alma mater. The ensemble is known for its members who arrange the pieces played by the group. They consist of bandurria players, octavina players, laud players, guitarists, two bassists and a drummer.

In the school year 2013-2014, the ensemble will take their chance again to compete in the prestigious NAMCYA for the rondalla group category.

Clubs and Organizations

Supreme Student Government
The Supreme Student Government or SSG is the highest governing student body in the campus. The officers are elected every year.

References

Science high schools in Metro Manila
Schools in Muntinlupa